Progon may refer to:

 House of Progon, 12–13th century Albanian monarchs
 Progon family, established the first Albanian state, the Principality of Arbër
 Progon, Lord of Kruja, a late 12th-century Byzantine-Albanian lord and first known Albanian

See also 
 Progonos (disambiguation)